Black Jack, also known as Captain Blackjack, is a 1950 adventure film written and directed by Julien Duvivier and starring George Sanders, Herbert Marshall, Patricia Roc and Dennis Wyndham. Set on the Mediterranean, it tells the story of a man who does evil deeds. Although his conscience is awakened and he has fallen in love, escaping his past proves impossible.  The English-language film was a co-production between France, Spain and the United States.

Plot
Demobilised after World War II, Mike Alexander pursues any deals, legal or not, which will make him a fortune. He has acquired a yacht in Mallorca, where he hears of a cargo ship in difficulty, the Chalcis, which is full of refugees. He agrees to take the six richest off the ship, but is sickened by the distress of the rest and tells the captain to put them ashore on an isolated island. He also sees an attractive young woman, Ingrid, who refuses his offer of a free trip to safety. The captain scuttles the ship in a hidden cove and takes Ingrid to Tangier.

Shortly after, Ingrid turns up in Mallorca as companion to an eccentric American millionairess, Emily Birk. Again she refuses the advances of Alexander, even when he says his fortune is arriving soon. Mrs Birk tells her she is really a cop and is after Alexander, an evil crook who is expecting a cargo of drugs. Ingrid agrees to go with Alexander to the island where the Chalcis is lying and they are sickened to find all the refugees locked in the hold by the captain and dead. When Alexander's drugs arrive, concealed in a schooner, they are lifted by Mrs Birk, who is not a cop but a dealer, and hidden in the wreck of the Chalcis. Alexander finds this out and, his cover blown, destroys the consignment. To escape the law, he then heads in his yacht for Tangier and Ingrid agrees to flee with him. In an ending that was in accord with the Motion Picture Production Code, police launches pursue them and shoot Alexander dead.

Cast
 George Sanders as Mike Alexander
 Herbert Marshall as Doctor James Curtis
 Patricia Roc as Ingrid Dekker
 Agnes Moorehead as Emily Birk
 Marcel Dalio as Captain Nicarescu 
 Dennis Wyndham as Fernando Barrio
 Howard Vernon as Schooner Captain
 José Nieto as Inspector Carnero
 Jolie Gabor as jeweler

References

External links
 

1950 films
1950 adventure films
1950s English-language films
Films directed by Julien Duvivier
Films shot in Mallorca
French adventure films
Spanish adventure films
Seafaring films
Films set in the Mediterranean Sea
English-language French films
English-language Spanish films
American adventure films
American black-and-white films
Films scored by Joseph Kosma
1950s American films